Gérard Sulon (3 April 1938 – 18 October 2020) was a Belgian footballer who played as a midfielder.

Career
Sulon played for RFC Liège, CS Schaerbeek, Beerschot VAV and Crossing Schaerbeek.

He also earned 6 caps for the Belgium national team during 1964 and 1965.

His twin brother Albert Sulon was also a footballer.

Sulon died on 18 October 2020, aged 82.

References

External links
 

1938 births
2020 deaths
Belgian footballers
Belgium international footballers
RFC Liège players
K. Beerschot V.A.C. players
Association football midfielders
Belgian twins